Mount Oliver is a borough in Allegheny County, Pennsylvania,  United States. The borough is surrounded entirely by the city of Pittsburgh, having resisted annexations by the city, as it prefers to manage its own local needs and finances.

It is named for Oliver Ormsby, son of John Ormsby, who held the original land grant for the area from George III.  Mount Oliver has experienced some tough times of late which are associated with the slippage of the steel-making capacity of the Pittsburgh region. The population was 3,394 at the 2020 census.

Geography
Mount Oliver is located at  (40.411319, -79.986571). According to the U.S. Census Bureau, the borough has a total area of 0.3 square miles (0.9 km2), all land.

Surrounding neighborhoods
Mount Oliver is completely surrounded by six Pittsburgh neighborhoods, including the South Side Slopes to the north, Arlington to the northeast, Mt. Oliver to the southeast, Carrick to the south, Knoxville to the west, and Allentown in the northwest corner.

Demographics

As of the census of 2000, there were 3,970 people, 1,681 households, and 983 families residing in the borough. The population density was 11,720.0 people per square mile (4,508.3/km2). There were 1,864 housing units at an average density of 5,502.8 per square mile (2,116.7/km2). The racial makeup of the borough was 83.75% White, 11.74% African American, 0.23% Native American, 1.64% Asian, 0.03% Pacific Islander, 0.68% from other races, and 1.94% from two or more races. Hispanic or Latino of any race were 1.08% of the population.

There were 1,681 households, out of which 28.2% had children under the age of 18 living with them, 33.8% were married couples living together, 18.3% had a female householder with no husband present, and 41.5% were non-families. 34.0% of all households were made up of individuals, and 12.4% had someone living alone who was 65 years of age or older. The average household size was 2.36 and the average family size was 3.04.

In the borough the population was spread out, with 24.0% under the age of 18, 10.0% from 18 to 24, 30.0% from 25 to 44, 21.9% from 45 to 64, and 14.1% who were 65 years of age or older. The median age was 36 years. For every 100 females, there were 91.3 males. For every 100 females age 18 and over, there were 85.8 males.

The median income for a household in the borough was $27,990, and the median income for a family was $32,388. Males had a median income of $30,394 versus $25,255 for females. The per capita income for the borough was $15,104. About 14.7% of families and 19.3% of the population were below the poverty line, including 34.5% of those under age 18 and 12.2% of those age 65 or over.

Taxation 
Residents of Mount Oliver Borough pay a 2% tax on earned income to the Pittsburgh Public Schools district and 1% tax on earned income to the Borough of Mount Oliver. This means that Mount Oliver residents with earned income must file two different local tax forms for two different municipalities, and have two different due dates. The City of Pittsburgh gives residents until April 15 (or the first business day afterwards) to file, but the Borough of Mount Oliver imposes delinquent fees and penalties after January 31.

References

External links
 Borough of Mount Oliver official website

1892 establishments in Pennsylvania
Boroughs in Allegheny County, Pennsylvania
Enclaves in the United States
Pittsburgh metropolitan area
Populated places established in 1892